Saadullah Ghauri (born 17 September 1989) is a Pakistani cricketer. He made his first-class debut for Lahore Shalimar in the 2008–09 Quaid-e-Azam Trophy on 1 February 2009. In April 2018, he played for Zarai Taraqiati Bank Limited (ZTBL) in the final of the Patron's Trophy Grade-II tournament. ZTBL won the match, to qualify for the 2018–19 Quaid-e-Azam Trophy.

References

External links
 

1989 births
Living people
Pakistani cricketers
Lahore Shalimar cricketers
Zarai Taraqiati Bank Limited cricketers
Place of birth missing (living people)